Kočice is a settlement in the Haloze Hills in the Municipality of Žetale in eastern Slovenia. It is made up of several smaller dispersed hamlets: Boriče, Dobavsko, Jurovski Vrh, Kočice, Krošlji Vrh, Laze, Peklače, Plajnsko, Potni Vrh, Pšetna Graba, Šardinje, Tkavc, Vildon, Vinarje, Zadnje, and Zalopata. The area traditionally belonged to the Styria region. It is now included in the Drava Statistical Region.

References

External links
Kočice on Geopedia

Populated places in the Municipality of Žetale